Sagard is an unorganized territory and hamlet in the Capitale-Nationale region of Quebec, Canada, part of the Charlevoix-Est Regional County Municipality. The hamlet of Sagard is located on the eastern banks of the Little Saguenay River, along Route 170 between Saint-Siméon and Petit-Saguenay.

Geography
The territory is characterized by a hilly terrain, dotted with many small lakes.

History
The territory and hamlet are named after the geographic township of Sagard, which was proclaimed in 1919 and named in honour of Théodat Sagard, a missionary of the Recollects order who is mainly remembered for his writings on New France and the Hurons.

Demographics

Private dwellings occupied by usual residents: 54 (total dwellings: 91)

Notable residents

The Desmarais family has a large estate in Sagard.

See also
List of unorganized territories in Quebec

References

Unorganized territories in Capitale-Nationale